Ibarreta is a settlement in northern Argentina. It is located in Formosa Province.

Populated places in Formosa Province
Cities in Argentina
Argentina
Formosa Province